Neil Crossley may refer to:

Neil Crossley (Coronation Street), fictional character introduced in 1963
Neil Crossley (EastEnders), fictional character introduced in 2016
Neil Crossley, member of British rock band Half Man Half Biscuit